Riccia fluitans, the floating crystalwort, is an aquatic floating plant of the liverwort genus Riccia which is popular among aquarists as a retreat for young fry and is used in live-bearing tanks. It can be found floating in ponds, and often forms thick mats on and under the water surface.

It normally grows quickly at the surface. When kept about two to three inches below an ordinary fluorescent bulb or in a pond exposed to full sunlight, it will form dense, bright green mats. Any single branch or antler bud can reproduce into a large colony if the plant is kept in proper conditions. It normally floats, but can also be attached to underwater objects such as logs and rocks. It can be attached with plastic mesh.

Floating crystalwort is generally not compatible with duckweeds, as they cover the surface of the water quite rapidly, crowding the Riccia out.  It is also easily overtaken by hair algae.

The species epithet fluitans is Latin for floating.

References

External links 
 Care information for Riccia Fluitans
 AquaHobby
 Krib discussions
 Natural Aquariums

 

Ricciaceae